The 2011 Copa Sony Ericsson Colsanitas was a tennis tournament played on outdoor clay courts. It was the 14th edition of the Copa Sony Ericsson Colsanitas, and was on the International category of the 2011 WTA Tour. It took place at the Club Campestre El Rancho in Bogotá, Colombia, from February 14 through February 20, 2011.

Finals

Singles

 Lourdes Domínguez Lino defeated  Mathilde Johansson, 2–6, 6–3, 6–2
It was Lino's 1st title of the year and 2nd of her career. It was her 2nd win at the event, also winning in 2006.

Doubles

 Edina Gallovits-Hall /  Anabel Medina Garrigues defeated  Sharon Fichman /  Laura Pous Tió, 2–6, 7–6(8–6), [11–9]

WTA entrants

Seeds

1 Rankings are as of February 7, 2011.

Other entrants
The following players received wildcards into the main draw:
 Catalina Castaño
 Leticia Costas Moreira
 Sílvia Soler Espinosa

The following players received entry from the qualifying draw:

 Bianca Botto
 Corinna Dentoni
 Sharon Fichman
 Beatriz García Vidagany

References

External links
Official website

Copa Sony Ericsson Colsanitas
Copa Colsanitas
2011 in Colombian tennis